KLMM (94.1 FM) is a commercial radio station that is licensed to Oceano, California and serves the San Luis Obispo area. The station is owned by Lazer Licenses, LLC and broadcasts a regional Mexican music format.

History
The station first signed on in September 1997 as KBZK and originally was licensed to Morro Bay, California. It was owned by Sarape Communications Inc., headed by Andrew James Fakas, and broadcast an adult contemporary music format. In November 1998, Sarape Communications sold KBZK and sister station KBZX (103.1 FM) in Paso Robles to Moon Broadcasting Paso Robles LLC, a Los Angeles-based ownership group led by Abel A. de Luna, for $750,000. At the time, KBZX was simulcasting KBZK's AC format. The following April, the new owner broke the simulcast and flipped each station to separate Spanish-language programming; KBZK became KLMM, a regional Mexican music outlet branded as "La Maquina Musical". In June 2000, Oxnard-based Lazer Broadcasting purchased KLMM and its Paso Robles sister station, now called KLUN, from Moon Broadcasting for $1.15 million.

References

External links

LMM
LMM
Mass media in San Luis Obispo County, California